Beverly Estelle Daggett (née Clark; September 9, 1945September 6, 2015) was a Maine politician. Daggett, a Democrat, represented the state capital Augusta in the Maine House of Representatives for five terms (1986–1996) before being elected to the Maine State Senate in 1996. She served in the Senate from 1996 to 2004. In 2002, she was elected the 111th President of the Maine Senate. She was the first woman to serve as Senate President.

In 1996, Daggett received a donated kidney from her mother. In 2008, it was reported that she needed another kidney and was receiving dialysis treatment.  Daggett died in Lewiston on September 6, 2015, three days before her 70th birthday. She was serving as a commissioner of Kennebec County at the time of her death.

Daggett's family cabin on Preacher's Point, Webber Pond (Vassalboro, ME) was featured on Maine Cabin Masters Season 1, Episode 1.

References

1945 births
2015 deaths
People from Florence, South Carolina
Politicians from Augusta, Maine
Democratic Party members of the Maine House of Representatives
Presidents of the Maine Senate
Democratic Party Maine state senators
Women state legislators in Maine
County commissioners in Maine
21st-century American politicians
21st-century American women politicians